Protein FAM57B is a protein that in humans is encoded by the FAM57B gene.

References

Further reading